Julia Reid (née Rudman; born 16 July 1952) is a British politician and a former Member of the European Parliament (MEP) for the South West England region.

Education and early career 
She was educated at Bentley Grammar School, Calne, and the University of Bath, where she graduated with a degree in biochemistry, later obtaining a PhD in pharmacology. She worked as a diabetes laboratory researcher at Bath's Royal United Hospital until being made redundant in 2009.

Political career 
Reid joined the Social Democratic Party (SDP) during its inaugural year, 1981, and stayed with the party until its merger with the Liberals in 1988. Reid opposed the pro-EEC stance of the new Liberal Democrats and instead joined the continuing SDP, remaining with them until their demise in 1990.

In 1993, Reid joined the newly founded UK Independence Party (UKIP). She was fourth on the South West region party list for the 2009 European election. In 2010, she contested the new seat of Chippenham in the general election, finishing fourth with 1,783 votes (3.4%). In 2011, she became a research assistant for UKIP MEP Trevor Colman. She was elected in 2014 for UKIP in the South West England region of the European Parliament. She contested Chippenham again in 2015, coming third.

Reid left UKIP in December 2018 in protest at the party's move to the right and, as the "final straw", the appointment of Tommy Robinson as an advisor. She joined the new Brexit Party in February 2019.

In local government, Reid was elected to Calne town council in 2013.

References

External links
 
Dr Julia Reid on Twitter

1952 births
Living people
Alumni of the University of Bath
UK Independence Party parliamentary candidates
UK Independence Party MEPs
MEPs for England 2014–2019
21st-century women MEPs for England
Social Democratic Party (UK) politicians
Brexit Party MEPs
People from Lewisham
People from Wiltshire
British Eurosceptics